Stephan Thönnessen (born 20 March 1962) is a German fencer. He competed in the individual and team sabre events at the 1988 Summer Olympics.

References

External links
 

1962 births
Living people
German male fencers
Olympic fencers of West Germany
Fencers at the 1988 Summer Olympics
Sportspeople from Cologne